Padenia transversa is a moth of the subfamily Arctiinae. It was described by Francis Walker in 1854. It is found in Sri Lanka and on the Andamans.

Description
The head, thorax and abdomen are yellowish white suffused with fuscous. Forewings are yellowish white. Antemedial and postmedials are slightly angled fuscous bands. Hindwings are yellowish white with a slight fuscous tinge.

References

Lithosiini
Moths described in 1854